Donald Station may refer to:

 Donald, British Columbia, a ghost town
 Donald railway station, Victoria, a closed railway station on the Mildura railway line in Donald, Victoria, Australia